Oscar Briceño (born September 6, 1985) is a Colombian football forward who plays for Mineros de Guayana in Venezuela.

Career
Oscar is a born scorer, who started his career very well in Deportes Tolima, but has been declining at their level, to be removed from the team owner Millonarios in 2007.

He played with the Colombia  U-20 at the 2003 FIFA World Youth Championship in UAE, helping Colombia team finish 3rd by beating Argentina 2-1.

Titles

External links

 BDFA profile

1985 births
Living people
Colombian footballers
Colombia under-20 international footballers
Colombia international footballers
2005 CONCACAF Gold Cup players
Deportes Tolima footballers
Millonarios F.C. players
C.S. Herediano footballers
Alianza Atlético footballers
Monagas S.C. players
A.C.C.D. Mineros de Guayana players
Deportivo Pasto footballers
Categoría Primera A players
Peruvian Primera División players
Colombian expatriate footballers
Expatriate footballers in Peru
Expatriate footballers in Costa Rica
Expatriate footballers in Venezuela
Association football forwards
People from Cúcuta